Qipengyuania vulgaris is a Gram-negative and aerobic bacteria from the genus Qipengyuania which has been isolated from a starfish (Stellaster equestris) from the South China Sea.

References

Further reading

External links
Type strain of Erythrobacter vulgaris at BacDive -  the Bacterial Diversity Metadatabase

Sphingomonadales
Bacteria described in 2006